Patrick Donahue may refer to:

 Patrick James Donahue (1849–1922), English prelate of the Roman Catholic Church
 Patrick J. Donahue II (born 1957), United States Army general

See also
Patrick Donoghue (fl. 1920s), English footballer
Patrick Donohoe (1820–1876), Irish recipient of the Victoria Cross